Marjan Ilievski (born December 7, 1975) is a former Macedonian professional basketball Guard, and now he is a basketball coach.

External links
 Balkanleague Profile
 Eurobasket Profile
 FIBA Profile

References

1975 births
Macedonian men's basketball players
Living people
Sportspeople from Skopje
Macedonian basketball coaches
Guards (basketball)